Rokos is a surname. Notable people with the surname include:

Chris Rokos (born 1970), British hedge fund manager
Drew Rokos, Australian comedian
Kyriakos Rokos, Greek sculptor